Tokyo 1st district (東京都第1区, Tōkyō-to dai-ikku or 東京1区, Tōkyō ikku) is a constituency of the House of Representatives in the Diet of Japan (national legislature). It is located in eastern mainland Tokyo and covers central parts of the former city of Tokyo. The district consists of the wards of Chiyoda, Minato and Shinjuku. As of 2016, 514,974 eligible voters were registered in the district. After redistricting in 2017, a part of Shinjuku was moved to the Tokyo 10th district and a part of Minato was moved to the Tokyo 2nd district.

Before the electoral reform of 1994, the area had been part of Tokyo 1st district where three Representatives had been elected by single non-transferable vote. The two main candidates contesting the 1st district until 2009, Banri Kaieda (DPJ, Hatoyama group) and Kaoru Yosano (formerly LDP, without faction), had represented the old multi-member 1st district of Tokyo. In 2012, Yosano retired, and LDP newcomer Miki Yamada narrowly beat Kaieda who was re-elected to a proportional seat leading the Democratic list in Tokyo with a sekihairitsu of 98.6%.

Kaieda regained the seat in the 2017 election.

List of representatives

Election results

See Also 

 Tokyo 1st district (1947–1993)
 Tokyo 1st district (1946)
 Tokyo 1st district (1928-1942)
 Tokyo 1st district (1890-1898)

References 

Politics of Tokyo
Districts of the House of Representatives (Japan)